

Listings by nationality

List of American game shows
List of Australian game shows
List of British game shows
Lists of Canadian game shows (includes English language and French language game shows)
List of international game shows

External links
List of American game shows
List of Canadian game shows